Reynaldo Trevino Lopez (born December 5, 1949) is an American politician serving as a member of the Texas House of Representatives from the 125th district. Lopez was elected in 2018 and assumed office on March 21, 2019. Lopez had previously served for four terms as a member of the San Antonio City Council.

Early life 
Lopez was raised in Charlotte, Texas. After graduating from Harlandale High School, he enlisted in the United States Army.

Career 
Lopez served in the United States Army Reserve for 14 years, retiring with the rank of staff sergeant. He later worked as an executive at AT&T, where he managed a team of technology employees. In 2004, he was elected to the San Antonio City Council for the sixth district. Lopez had previously served on the board of the Northside Independent School District

Personal life 
Lopez married his wife, Evelyn, in 1971. They have four children.

References 

Living people
1949 births
21st-century American politicians
People from San Antonio
Hispanic and Latino American state legislators in Texas
Democratic Party members of the Texas House of Representatives
San Antonio City Council members